Stoneywood is a small area of the city of Aberdeen, Scotland, located between Dyce and Bucksburn near Aberdeen Airport. Stoneywood is served by two primary schools and one secondary school, which sits in Bucksburn. The main road running through the suburb is the A947, a north-south two-lane highway linking Aberdeen with Banff on the coast.

References

Villages in Aberdeen